Bojanowo is a town in Rawicz County, Greater Poland Voivodeship, western Poland. It is the seat of Gmina Bojanowo (commune). As of June 2021, it has a population of 2,895.

History
As part of the region of Greater Poland, i.e. the cradle of the Polish state, the area formed part of Poland since its establishment in the 10th century. Bojanowo was granted town rights in 1638. It was administratively located in the Poznań Voivodeship in the Greater Poland Province of the Kingdom of Poland. It was annexed by Prussia in the Second Partition of Poland. Following the successful Greater Poland uprising of 1806, it was regained by Poles and included within the short-lived Duchy of Warsaw. After its dissolution in 1815, it was re-annexed by Prussia, within which it was located in the Kreis Rawitsch of Provinz Posen. Following World War I, Poland regained independence and control of the town.

During the German occupation of Poland (World War II), in December 1939, the occupiers carried out expulsions of Poles, mostly craftsmen, postal workers and intelligentsia with entire families, as well as several local Jews. Houses and workshops of the expellees were handed over to German colonists as part of the Lebensraum policy.

Sports
The local football club is Ruch Bojanowo. It competes in the lower leagues.

Notable residents
 Julius Frauenstädt (1813-1879), German philosopher
 Gottschalk Eduard Guhrauer (1809–1854), German philologist and biographer

References

External links

Bojanowo City Guide
Virtual Shtetl, Jewish history of the town
Official website 
Official website of parish in Bojanowo 
Official website of football club in Bojanowo - Ruch Bojanowo 
Official website of fire department 

Cities and towns in Greater Poland Voivodeship
Rawicz County